William Louis may refer to

William Louis, Count of Nassau-Dillenburg
William Louis, Count of Nassau-Saarbrücken
William Louis, Duke of Württemberg
William Louis, Prince of Anhalt-Harzgerode
William Louis, Prince of Anhalt-Köthen
William Louis, Prince of Baden